The men's 5000 metres walk event  at the 1992 European Athletics Indoor Championships was held in Palasport di Genova on 28 February.

Results

References

Racewalking at the European Athletics Indoor Championships
Walk